Dennis Kayser (born c. 1954) is an American football executive and former coach.  He is the senior director of on-field operations for the National Football League (NFL).  Kayser was the head football coach at State University of New York at Cortland in Cortland, New York from 1986 to 1989, where he accumulated a record of 26–15 and took the Red Dragons to the NCAA Division III playoffs twice.

Head coaching record

College football

References

Year of birth missing (living people)
1950s births
Living people
Cortland Red Dragons football coaches
Dartmouth Big Green football coaches
Ithaca Bombers football players
Ithaca Bombers men's lacrosse players
Lafayette Leopards football coaches
National Football League executives
Princeton Tigers football coaches
Springfield Pride football coaches
Springfield Pride men's lacrosse coaches
Union Dutchmen football coaches
Union Dutchmen men's lacrosse coaches
Sportspeople from the Bronx
Players of American football from New York (state)
Lacrosse players from New York (state)